The 1910–11 Magyar Kupa (English: Hungarian Cup) was the 2nd season of Hungary's annual knock-out cup football competition.

Final

See also
 1910–11 Nemzeti Bajnokság I

References

External links
 Official site 
 soccerway.com

1910–11 in Hungarian football
1910–11 domestic association football cups
1910-11